FallCon is the largest and only boardgame convention in Calgary, Alberta featuring a broad range of modern boardgames and miniatures. During the three day convention, attendees can learn new games by signing up for hosted game or check-out a game from the library in the open gaming session (ambassadors are available to make game recommendations or to help with rules / finding other players).  The family friendly event also features a live auction Saturday night and a Flea Market Sunday morning.  The 2017 event will be at SAIT.

Calgary has a strong boardgame community, which the Calgary Herald credits to events like FallCon and game store The Sentry Box . The convention is managed by a team of four directors and the approximately 30 Board Game Ambassadors, who all volunteer to teach boardgames to the general public.

The event started as a group of wargamers putting up their own money to rent the hall for the weekend and play games with a few of their friends. in 2010 FallCon had approximately 400 attendees, and has expanded 5–10% per year since.  In 2015 FallCon has an extensive 1400+ boardgame library listed on boardgamegeek.com under the user name DBezzant. FallCon holds a 400 used game auction that only takes 2hrs to complete on the Saturday evening of the event.

2015 FallCon announced some changes to the line-up of their event, including a giant version of King of Tokyo. The online signup for hosted games has been reduced to only the select few staples of FallCon: 12 Man Titan, Formula De, Roborally and Circus Maximus. Several gameshow type events has also been added, including Wheel of Fortune, Wits & Wagers and Things in a Box, and a Family Game Zone has been added.

FallCon 365 is a directive managed by one of the FallCon Ambassadors to expand the Boardgame community to the general public. This directive hosts approximately a dozen different free gaming events each month. These events a generally held at local game stores, the Legion 285, or at several Calgary Co-Op grocery store community rooms. Ambassadors bring games from their own library and/or FallCons' library for others to play at the events. These events are hosted by an ambassador and several usually attend to teach games to attendees.  These smaller events usually have 20–60 attendees with 35 on average. FallCon Ambassadors are called upon several times in a year to host boardgame events at other large conventions in Calgary. Otafest 2015 had 9000 attendees and FallCon had on hand many Anime Themed boardgames for the Anime Convention. Comic Expos' boardgame room in 2013 was run by FallCon Ambassadors. Geekmoot 2015 had a dozen or more Ambassadors volunteer their time to run the boardgame room. 

Canadian Game of the Year Awards are given out at FallCon. The Game of the year awards are managed by the directors of FallCon. The Game Artisons of Canada  are one of the primary supplier of new prototypes to this award. Each year the award winner receives a hand crafted wooden plaque with the CGDA logo on it, and a monetary sum.

External links
 FallCon Homepage 
 Canadian Game Artisans 
 The Sentry Box

References
References: 

Gaming conventions